Rifai (also Rufai, Rifaiyya, Rifaiya) is an eminent Sufi order (tariqa) within Sunni Islam founded by Ahmed ar-Rifai and developed in the Lower Iraq marshlands between Wasit and Basra. The Rifa'iyya had its greatest following until the 15th century C.E. when it was overtaken by the Qadiri order. The order is said to wield particular influence in Cairo, Egypt. 

The Rifai order is most commonly found in the Arab Middle East but also in Turkey, the Balkans and South Asia.

History

Records indicate Ahmad al-Rifai inherited his maternal uncle's, Mansur al-Bata'ihi, position of headship to his religious community in 1145-6 C.E. At this time many followed his activities in and around the village of Umm 'Ubayda. In the Lower Iraq marshlands, the Rifai order developed and gained notice throughout the 12th century C.E. due to its extravagant practices. Rifai expanded into Egypt and Syria.

In 1268 C.E., Abu Muhammad Ali al-Hariri formed the Syrian branch of the order which became known as the Haririya. The Rifai gained further popularity in Egypt and Turkey. In the 15th century C.E., its popularity waned and the popularity of the Qadiriyya order rose. Subsequently, interest in the Rifai order centered within Arab lands.

The order has a presence in Syria and Egypt and plays a noticeable role in Kosovo and Albania. The Rifai Tariqa blends worship styles or ideas with those of other orders that predominate in the local area.  For example, the group established by Kenan Rifai in Istanbul that reflects elements of the Mevlevi Order, while more rural Turkish Rifa'is have absorbed significant influence from the Alevi/Bektashi tradition.

The order spread into Anatolia during the 14th and 15th Centuries and ibn Battuta noted Rifai 'tekkes' in central Anatolia. The order however, began to make progress in Turkey during the 17th to 19th centuries when tekkes began to be found in Istanbul. The order spread into the Balkans (especially Bosnia, where they are still present), modern day Albania and Kosovo.

In the United States and Canada tekkes (lodges) are found in Staten Island and Toronto that were under the guidance of the late Shaykh Xhemali Shehu (d.2004) of Prizren, Kosovo.

Practices
During heightened states of Rifai Ratib, Rifai followers were noted to have eaten live snakes, entered ovens filled with fire and ridden on lions.  Followers were also noted to have practiced charming snakes and thrusting iron spikes and glass into their bodies.

It is uncertain whether or not Ahmed ar-Rifai instituted the practices that helped solidify the Rifai order's massive popularity. While some scholars attribute these practices to al-Rifai, other scholars contend he was unaware of these practices and that these were introduced after the Mongol invasion.

Prominent Rifa'is
 Samiha Ayverdi
 Agah Oktay Güner
 Cemalnur Sargut
 Kenan Rifa'i

Notes

Sources

External links
 

Sufi orders
Sunni Sufi orders
Rifa'i order